Robert Anthony Scalapino  (19 October 1919 – 1 November 2011) (Chinese name: 施樂伯) was an American political scientist particularly involved in East Asian studies. He was one of the founders and first chairman of the National Committee on United States – China Relations. Together with his co-author Chong-Sik Lee, he won the 1974 Woodrow Wilson Foundation Award for the best book on government, politics, or international affairs as awarded by the American Political Science Association. Scalapino's daughters include the artist Diane Sophia and poet Leslie Scalapino (1944–2010).

Scalapino was born to Anthony and Beulah Stephenson Scalapino in Leavenworth, Kansas. In 1940, he completed his bachelor's degree at Santa Barbara College (now the University of California, Santa Barbara) where he was student body president in his last year. He married Ida Mae Jessen, the next year on 23 August 1941. Over time they had three children: Leslie, Diane, and Lynne. Scalapino received his master's degree in 1943 and his doctorate in 1948, both from Harvard. During World War II he served in U.S. Naval Intelligence from 1943 to 1946, where he studied Japanese. He reached the rank of lieutenant junior grade.

After graduating from Harvard, Scalapino remained there for a year teaching as an instructor, and then went to the University of California at Berkeley as an assistant professor in 1949. He achieved full professor status in 1956, and took emeritus status in 1990. He was chair of Department of Political Science from 1962 to 1965. He founded and was the first director of the Institute of East Asian Studies, from 1978 to 1990. He sat on the board of directors of the Council on Foreign Relations and was a member of the American Academy of Arts and Sciences. He was editor of the scholarly journal, Asian Survey, from 1962 to January 1996. Scalapino remained active into his late 80s, serving as a government consultant and testifying at Congressional hearings.

In 2010, The National Bureau of Asian Research and the Woodrow Wilson International Center for Scholars, as part of the National Asia Research Program (NARP), created the Scalapino Prize in honor of Scalapino and his contributions to the field of Asian studies. The prize would be awarded to an outstanding scholar in the field of Asian studies every two years. The inaugural Scalapino Prize was awarded to David M. Lampton in June 2010 at the 2010 Asia Policy Assembly.

He died of complications from a respiratory infection on 1 November 2011, at the age of 92.

Awards
1973 with Chong-Sik Lee, the Woodrow Wilson Foundation Award for their book Communism in Korea
1976 honorary LL.D., Academia Sinica (Taiwan)
1983 honorary D.P.S., Hankuk University of Foreign Studies (Korea)
1989 honorary D.P.S., Kyung Hee University (Korea)
1988 Order of the Sacred Treasure (Japan)
1990 Presidential Order (Korea)
1990 Berkeley Citation, University of California at Berkeley

Selected publications
Scalapino published 540 articles and 39 books or monographs on Asian politics and United States–Asian policy, which include:
1953 Democracy and the Party Movement in Pre-War Japan
1961 with George T. Yu The Chinese Anarchist Movement
1962 with Junnosuke Masumi Parties and Politics in Contemporary Japan
1967 The Japanese Communist Movement, 1920-1966
1972 with Chong-Sik Lee Communism in Korea
1972 Elites in the People's Republic of China
1975 Asia and the Road Ahead
1979 The United States and Korea: Looking Ahead
1983 The Early Japanese Labor Movement
1989 The Politics of Development: Perspectives on Twentieth Century Asia
1992 The Last Leninists: The Uncertain Future of Asia's Communist States
1997 North Korea at a Crossroads
2008 From Leavenworth to Lhasa: living in a revolutionary era

Notes

Further reading
Scalapino, Robert A. (2008) From Leavenworth to Lhasa: living in a revolutionary era Institute of East Asian Studies, University of California, Berkeley, California,

External links
 "Robert A. Scalapino biographic sketch" Institute for Corean-American Studies (ICAS)
 "Institute of East Asian Studies - University of California - Robert A. Scalapino" Vietnamese Professionals of America, VPA Inc.
 Speech by Robert Scalapino on 17 March 1967, on emerging nations. Audio recording from The University of Alabama's Emphasis Symposium on Contemporary Issues

American political scientists
American political writers
American male non-fiction writers
Scholars of nationalism
Harvard University alumni
Harvard University faculty
University of California, Santa Barbara alumni
University of California, Berkeley faculty
United States Navy officers
1919 births
2011 deaths
Military personnel from California